The campus of Texas Tech University is located in the city of Lubbock in the center of the South Plains region near the Caprock Escarpment of the Llano Estacado. Situated on .The Lubbock campus is home to the main academic university, law school, and medical school. This arrangement makes it the only institution in Texas to have all three units (undergraduate institution, law school, and medical school) on the same physical campus.

The campus' most prominent feature is its Spanish Renaissance architecture, inspired by the University de Alcalá in Alcalá de Henares, Spain, and Mission San José in San Antonio. A large section of the campus built between 1924 and 1951 is listed on the National Register of Historic Places as the Texas Technological College Historic District.

Buildings
 "—" indicates that the year building opened is unknown.

References 
General

Specific

External links 

Interactive map of the Texas Tech University campus

Texas Tech University
 
Buildings
Texas Tech University